Pseudorana weiningensis is a species of true frog endemic to China. It is the only species in the genus Pseudorana. It is also known as the Weining frog or Weining groove-toed frog. Its natural habitats are temperate shrubland, temperate grassland, and rivers. It is threatened by habitat loss.

References

True frogs
Amphibians of China
Taxonomy articles created by Polbot
Amphibians described in 1962